Seay's Chapel Methodist Church is a historic Methodist church located near Palmyra, Fluvanna County, Virginia. It was built between 1893 and 1902, and is a one-story, 30 feet by 40 feet, vernacular Carpenter Gothic style chapel. It features a slate gable roof with ornamental wooden brackets under the eaves and along the gables and a rectangular wooden panel design in the front and rear gables. Also on the property is the contributing church cemetery.

It was listed on the National Register of Historic Places in 2012.

References

Churches on the National Register of Historic Places in Virginia
Churches completed in 1902
Buildings and structures in Fluvanna County, Virginia
National Register of Historic Places in Fluvanna County, Virginia
Carpenter Gothic church buildings in Virginia
Methodist churches in Virginia
Virginia Historic Landmarks